The 1948–49 National Football League was the 18th staging of the National Football League, an annual Gaelic football tournament for the Gaelic Athletic Association county teams of Ireland.

Mayo won the NFL with a narrow defeat of Louth in the final.

Format 
Instead of geographic groupings, teams are placed into Divisions I, II, III and IV. The top team in each division reaches the semi-finals.

League Phase

Division I (Dr Lagan Cup)

Division II

Group A Results

Group B Results

Division II Final

Tables

Group A

Group B

Division III

Group A
Westmeath, Cavan, Meath

Group B
Louth, Dublin, Longford

Group B Results

Division III Final

Division IV

Group A
Limerick, Tipperary, Clare

Section B
Wexford, Wicklow, Carlow

Section C
Offaly, Kildare, Laois, Cork

Group C Results

Play-Off

Knockout phase

Semi-final

Final

References

National Football League
National Football League
National Football League (Ireland) seasons